Stereo Total is a compilation album by the band of the same name, released in 1998 on Bobsled Records. It was the first album the band released in the United States, and features songs from their first two albums (Oh Ah! and Monokini). Upon its release, it received favorable reviews from Spin, the Washington City Paper, and the Village Voice, and the band went on a tour in support of the album in the following spring.

Track listing
 Dactylo Rock
 C'Est la Mort
 Furore
 Schön Von Hinten
 Movie Star
 CA, USA LA
 Get Down Tonight
 Comme un Garcon
 Ach Ach Liebling
 Push It
 Miau Miau
 Supergirl
 Ushilo Sugata Ga Kilei
 Johnny
 Morose
 Dilindam
 Je Suis Venu Te Dire Que Je M'En Vais

References

Stereo Total albums
1998 compilation albums